Estrela Miyazaki was a Japanese football club based in Miyazaki. The club played in the Japan Football League. J.FC Miyazaki is considered a spiritual successor.

Club name
1970-1998 : Miyazaki Teachers SC
1999-2002 : Profesor Miyazaki
2003-2006 : Sun Miyazaki
2007-2009 : Estrela Miyazaki

External links
Football of Japan

M
1999 establishments in Japan
2009 disestablishments in Japan
Sports teams in Miyazaki Prefecture
Japan Football League clubs
Association football clubs established in 1999
Association football clubs disestablished in 2009
Miyazaki (city)